Mohammad Abul Kashem (known as Principal Abul Kashem, 28 June 1920 – 11 March 1991) is generally considered as a pioneer and the architect of the historic Language Movement of Bangladesh. He was also a politician, author and an eminent educationist. He founded the Islamic-oriented Bengali cultural organisation Tamaddun Majlish.

Early life 
Kashem was born on 28 June 1920 at a village Cheebandy-Barama under Chandanaish Upazila of district of Chittagong. In 1939, Kashem obtained his Matriculation Examination from Boroma Trahi Menka High School with first class and Government district scholarship. He passed Isc from Chittagong government College in 1941 with first class. From Dhaka University, he obtained a Bachelor of Science (honors) in Physics in 1944 and a Master of Science degree in physics in 1945. He completed his master's thesis under the supervision of the famous mathematician and physicist Satyendra Nath Bose.

Involvement in Language Movement 
Kashem was associated with the literary and cultural activities of Bangladesh for five decades. He contributed in the movement for recognition of Bengali as one of the state languages of Pakistan soon after the independence of Pakistan in 1947. On 1 September 1947 he founded the Pakistan Tamaddun Majlish as a non-political cultural organisation to mobilise students, intellectuals and the people in general for the Bengali language. On 15 September 1947 he published a booklet entitled, Pakistaner Rashtra Bhasha: Bangla Na Urdu? (Pakistan's state language: Bengali or Urdu?) demanding introduction of Bengali as one of the state language of whole Pakistan. This booklet also strongly advocated for Bengali as the medium of education, court language and for its use in the offices in East Pakistan. Also his untiring efforts let to the formation of the first Rashtrabhasa Sangram Parishad (State Language Committee of Action) on 1 October 1947 with Nurul Huq Bhuiyan as the convener and he himself as the treasurer. On 6 December 1947, a meeting was held under the president-ship of Kashem in Dhaka University campus which protested the resolution of the education week held in Karachi suggesting Urdu as the state language and the lingua franca of Pakistan. A protest procession was brought out from the meeting, which met Khawaja Nazimuddin, the provincial Chief Minister, and other ministers. Khawaja Nazimuddin gave a written assurance to the Action Committee that he would do the needful to introduce Bengali as one of the state language of Pakistan. Kashem actively participated in organising a countrywide strike on 11 March 1948, to press for the language demand. As the outcome of the strike, on the eve of the impending visit of Mohammad Ali Jinnah (the founder of Pakistan) to Dhaka, the then Provincial Government had no other alternative but to sign an agreement with the action committee on 15 March 1948 for introducing Bengali as one of the state language of Pakistan.

Career 
Kashem began his career as a lecturer in the Physics department at Dhaka University in 1946. As a lecturer, he was the first person who delivered lectures in the Bengali at Dhaka University. He held his lecturer position until 1953.

Kashem was actively associated with politics. He was co-founders of the Khilafat-e-Rabbani Party in 1952. He was a member of the provincial assembly as a United Front nominee in 1954 from the Patia-Boalkhali constituency in Chittagong. While a member of the Legislative Assembly, he moved a resolution for introduction of Bengali as the medium of education at all levels. On 30 September 1956, he proposed Bengali as the state-language and it was approved unanimously and thus, Bengali received constitutional recognition as one of the State language of Pakistan. He founded the weekly Sainik in 1948, which acted as a mouthpiece of the historic Language Movement.

He felt the need of introducing Bengali as medium of higher education in colleges and universities. With his dream, he established the Bangla College at Mirpur, Dhaka in 1962 and served the college as Principal until 1981. He was the forerunner in introducing textbooks in Bengali for higher education and contributed much in initiating the Bengali version of the question papers for higher education.

Kashem received a number of national and social awards, including Independence Day Award in 1993, Ekushey Padak in 1987, Bangla Academy Literary Award (for his book Biggan Somaj O Dhormo) in 1982, Islamic foundation Award in 1988, Pakistan Writers guild award in 1964 etc. He was accorded a national reception in Dhaka in 1989 which was attended by eminent scholars and litterateurs of Bangladesh and India. In 2007, Dhaka City Corporation named the former Darussalam Road of Mirpur-1 as Bhasha Sainik Principal Abul Kashem Road for his contribution to historic Language Movement.

Kashem died at the Suhrawardy Hospital in Dhaka on Monday 11 March 1991.

List of works
A prolific writer, Kashem authored nearly 100 books including textbooks on science for postgraduate student and on education, Islam, culture and politics. These include 40 textbooks on physics and other science subjects for college and university levels. Some of his well-known books are:

Bengali

English

References

External links
 
 
 Bangla language movement 
 History of Bangladesh

Academic staff of the University of Dhaka
Bangladeshi politicians
Bangladeshi male writers
Bengali writers
People from Chittagong
1920 births
1991 deaths
Bangladeshi Sunni Muslims
Bengali language movement activists
Recipients of the Ekushey Padak
Recipients of the Independence Day Award